Neil Mann (born 19 November 1972 in Nottingham, England) is a former professional footballer who made 177 appearances in the Football League playing for Hull City and Scarborough. He currently coaches in Australia after leaving his role as Youth Recruitment Officer for Hull City in September 2013. He is the son of former footballer Arthur Fraser Mann

Career
Neil Mann was an attacking left-sided fullback/midfielder. He played for various non-league teams in England before being signed by Terry Dolan for Hull City in July 1993. He went on to become a fans favourite but his career was curtailed by a series of serious knee ligament injuries.

He is the son of Sandra Mann and Scottish former professional footballer and manager Arthur Mann.

References

External links

1972 births
Living people
Footballers from Nottingham
English footballers
Association football fullbacks
Grimsby Town F.C. players
Spalding United F.C. players
Grantham Town F.C. players
Hull City A.F.C. players
Scarborough F.C. players
Gainsborough Trinity F.C. players
Notts County F.C. players
Association football midfielders